The Lady from Argentina (German: Das Fräulein aus Argentinien) is a 1928 German silent film directed by Siegfried Philippi and starring Hans Albers.

The film's sets were designed by the art directors Gustav A. Knauer and Willy Schiller.

Cast
In alphabetical order
 Hans Albers 
 Gerd Briese 
 Olga Engl 
 Robert Garrison 
 Gritta Ley 
 Gerhard Ritterband 
 Hermine Sterler 
 Jakob Tiedtke 
 Leopold von Ledebur

References

Bibliography
 Parish, Robert. Film Actors Guide. Scarecrow Press, 1977.

External links

1928 films
Films of the Weimar Republic
Films directed by Siegfried Philippi
German silent feature films
German black-and-white films